Hypothetical is the fifth studio album by British progressive metal band Threshold. The album was released on 20 March 2001. This is the first album to feature current drummer Johanne James, who had previously played with the band on tour.

Track listing

Personnel 
 Karl Groom – guitar
 Johanne James – drums
 Jon Jeary – bass
 Andrew "Mac" McDermott – vocals
 Nick Midson – guitar
 Richard West – keyboards
 Holger Haubold - backing vocals on "Narcissus"

References

2001 albums
Threshold (band) albums
Inside Out Music albums
Albums produced by Karl Groom